Jan Sindewint, Latinized Joannes de Dunis (died 1319) was a monk of the Cistercian Abbey of Dunes in the County of Flanders, and from 1311 a professor of theology at the Collège Saint-Bernard in the University of Paris. In 1311 he acquired the use of the books of the recently deceased Jan van He, a monk of Ter Doest Abbey who had taught theology at the Collège de Sorbonne from 1303 to 1306.

References

Year of birth unknown
1319 deaths
University of Paris alumni
Academic staff of the University of Paris
Cistercians
14th-century Roman Catholic theologians